Columbia is a U.S. city in and the county seat of Marion County, Mississippi, which was formed six years before Mississippi was admitted to statehood. Columbia was named for Columbia, South Carolina, from which many of the early settlers had migrated. The population was 6,582 as of the 2010 census.

History
Columbia is the county seat of Marion County, Mississippi. Marion County was created out of Amite County in 1811, encompassing the southwest quarter of the current state of Mississippi. Before statehood in 1816, there were three territorial census/poll tax records taken of what was deemed Marion County at the time. These records reveal that during 1813, several Lott men arrived and settled on the Pearl River in what is now Columbia. In 1813, William Lott was the largest slave holder near present-day Columbia, owning 28 slaves. There were five men, who settled south of present-day Columbia on 2,789 acres of land with 65 slaves. North of present-day Columbia, on what was the earliest attempt at a town, was Timothy Terrell on 3,151 acres with 32 slaves.

The land on which the current City of Columbia resides was first purchased for cash on April 18, 1820, by William Lott and John Lott. This land is Township 3 East, Range 18 West, Section 5 (640 acres), which is the center of the City of Columbia today. Other early patent holders of Columbia include James Phillips, Jr., and John Cooper (1825), in Section 4 next to John and William Lott.

Columbia was officially incorporated on June 25, 1819, becoming the fourth municipality in the state of Mississippi.  It served as the temporary capital of Mississippi from November 1821, when the 5th session of the Mississippi Legislature first met there, until 1822.  In that year, a special session of the legislature met in Columbia, inaugurating Governor Walter Leake, and selecting LeFleur's Bluff (now Jackson) as the permanent capital.

Columbia, "The City of Charm on the River Pearl", has always been in danger of flooding, due to its bordering the Pearl River. The county courthouse, with its records dating back to pre-statehood, has managed to survive war, floods, tornadoes and hurricanes. In its first 100 years, Columbia relied on the Pearl River for transportation of goods. The river was much deeper and wider than it is now. Steamboat captains, such as John Black, lived in Columbia.

During the Civil War, United States troops under the command of General Davidson camped outside Columbia, taking provisions from the citizens of the Confederate States of America. The courthouse was spared. The Southern Claims Commission Files detail these events.

In 1935, Mississippi's first rodeo was held in Columbia.  In 2016, the Mississippi Rodeo Hall of Fame was founded and headquartered in Columbia.

During the Civil Rights Movement, Columbia, and Marion County were the site of the most peaceful demonstrations, due to the diligent insistence of non-violence by Sheriff John Homer Willoughby. The town is known for its citizens ability to work together.

In 2005, Columbia suffered extensive damage from Hurricane Katrina. Once again, the courthouse survived. There was very limited looting, and citizens worked together with local churches, civic officials, and law enforcement to provide for citizens during the extensive power loss. Individuals immediately began helping their neighbors clear roads and escape being trapped in debris. 

The day after Hurricane Katrina struck, several inmates took advantage of the storm damage and escaped from the Marion County Jail (some of whom were charged with Murder). Marion County Deputies along with the help of the Mississippi National Guard and Kentucky State Police, captured all but one escapee who was later apprehended in Texas just before he could get to the Mexican Border.

Former Mississippi governor and Columbia native Hugh L. White introduced white squirrels to the area, and they are still common in Columbia City Park. His home still stands today, a stately reminder of architecture of the past.

In 2014, a tornado measuring EF3 on the Enhanced Fujita scale struck Columbia, causing widespread damage.   Mutual aid took place between Columbia, Mississippi and Columbia, South Carolina following this natural disaster and the 1000 year flood in South Carolina,

Geography
Columbia is located on the east bank of the Pearl River and is 81 miles south of Jackson, Mississippi and 103 miles north of New Orleans, Louisiana.

Climate

According to the Köppen Climate Classification system, Columbia has a humid subtropical climate, abbreviated "Cfa" on climate maps.

Demographics

2020 census

As of the 2020 United States census, there were 5,864 people, 2,080 households, and 1,155 families residing in the city.

2000 census
As of the census of 2000, there were 6,603 people, 2,497 households, and 1,620 families residing in the city. The population density was 1,033.5 people per square mile (399.0/km2). There were 2,821 housing units at an average density of 441.6 per square mile (170.5/km2). The racial makeup of the city was 62.56% White, 35.64% African American, 0.39% Native American, 0.44% Asian, 0.18% from other races, and 0.79% from two or more races. Hispanic or Latino of any race were 0.77% of the population.

There were 2,497 households, out of which 29.5% had children under the age of 18 living with them, 41.5% were married couples living together, 19.7% had a female householder with no husband present, and 35.1% were non-families. 32.4% of all households were made up of individuals, and 18.1% had someone living alone who was 65 years of age or older. The average household size was 2.38 and the average family size was 3.01.

In the city, the population was spread out, with 23.9% under the age of 18, 10.0% from 18 to 24, 26.0% from 25 to 44, 19.3% from 45 to 64, and 20.8% who were 65 years of age or older. The median age was 38 years. For every 100 females, there were 88.1 males. For every 100 females aged 18 and over, there were 83.7 males.

The median income for a household in the city was $19,644, and the median income for a family was $28,493. Males had a median income of $28,173 versus $17,847 for females. The per capita income for the city was $12,592. About 24.5% of families and 29.7% of the population were below the poverty line, including 41.0% of those under age 18 and 24.3% of those age 65 or over.

Government and infrastructure
The Mississippi Department of Human Services's Division of Youth Services operated the Columbia Training School in unincorporated Marion County, near Columbia.

The mayor of Columbia is Justin McKenzie.

Education

The city of Columbia is served by the Columbia School District, with Columbia High School as the public high school. Prior to January 1970, black students were educated in a separate system with sub-par facilities, including John J. Jefferson High school, which became the middle school in January of 1970 when the schools were integrated. White politicians called for a public boycott of the school system. At that time, around 100 white students left the public school system to attend the newly founded whites-only Columbia Academy, which was created in September 1969 as a segregation academy to avoid racial integration. A few students also left to attend Improve Academy, another segregation academy founded by the Improve Baptist Church. There are also two other public schools that are in Columbia, East Marion High School and West Marion High School. Both of these schools are under the same district called Marion County Schools. East Marion High school is located just outside of town on the East side of the Pearl River, while West Marion is located on the West side of the Pearl River in Foxworth. East Marion is one largely connected building that houses grades K-12, but West Marion has a primary school as well as a high school.

Notable people
 Johnathan Abram - NFL safety for the Las Vegas Raiders
 Texas Rose Bascom (1922-1993) - rodeo performer, trick roper, Hollywood actress, Mississippi Rodeo Hall of Fame inductee
 Terrell Buckley - American football coach and former player
 Logan Cooke - NFL punter for the Jacksonville Jaguars
 Peggy Dow (Peggy Varnadow Helmerich) - film actress and philanthropist
 Jim Dunaway - former NFL defensive tackle
 Reverend John Ford - pioneering Methodist minister and early political leader
 Bobby Hamilton - former NFL defensive end, two-time Super Bowl winner with New England Patriots
 Claudis James  - former NFL player
 General Benjamin Lee - military leader and early political figure
 Sylvester Magee - last living American slave, died in Columbia in 1971
 Joseph T. "Joe" Owens (1945-2013) - former NFL defensive end
 Eddie Payton - former NFL running back
 Walter Payton - former NFL player in Pro Football Hall of Fame, born in Columbia
 Hugh L. White - former Columbia mayor and two-term Governor of Mississippi

References

External links

 
Cities in Mississippi
Cities in Marion County, Mississippi
County seats in Mississippi